The Way It Feels may refer to:

 The Way It Feels (Maddie & Tae album), released in 2020
 The Way It Feels (Roxanne Potvin album), released in 2006